Masiko Winifred Komuhangi is a Ugandan politician. She was the National Resistance Movement political party representative of Rukungiri District in the eighth and ninth Parliament of Uganda.

Controversy 
In 2002, Masiko Winifred Komuhangi and  Babihuga J. Winnie had a court a case on the Standard of proof in Electoral Offense. In the seventh Parliament of Uganda, the Rukungiri Member of Parliament, Winfred Masiko Komuhangi, lost her seat in an election petition filed by her predecessor, Winifred Babihuga. This is because her election was nullified by Court.

Masiko petitioned High Court on July 9 seeking nullification of the victory of Betty Bamukwatsa Muzanira, claiming the electoral process was marred with irregularities. Masiko  wanted the court to order for a fresh election. However, Muzanira, who contested on Forum for Democratic Change (FDC) party ticket, polled 50,611 votes while Masiko, who was under National Resistance Movement, got 46,379 votes. Independent candidate and former cabinet minister Sezi Prisca Mbaguta came third with 993 votes while the Progressive People’s Party’s Kakundakwe Fabith trailed with 183. The high court which was presided over by Justice Moses Kazibwe evaluated the petition and the evidence presented lacked merit and dismiss the petition with no costs.

In Rukungiri District, NRM lost the bi-election twice with Masiko Winifred Komuhangi contesting. This is because in 2018, the  citizens express anger over the NRM’s abuse of its numbers in parliament to pass an amendment to the constitution lifting the 75 year age cap on the president.

See also 

 List of members of the eighth Parliament of Uganda
 List of members of the ninth Parliament of Uganda
 Winifred Kiiza
 Joyce Bagala

External links 

 https://www.acode-u.org/uploadedFiles/PRS28.pdf
 https://www.cpahq.org/media/eldnym0h/theparliamentarian2019issuefourcoverfinalonlinesingle-2.pdf
 Management and Dispute Resolution of Elections in East Africa

References 

Living people
People from Rukungiri District
National Resistance Movement politicians
Members of the Parliament of Uganda
Women members of the Parliament of Uganda
Year of birth missing (living people)